Iphigenia (minor planet designation: 112 Iphigenia) is a fairly large and exceedingly dark main-belt asteroid. It is classified as a C-type asteroid, and therefore probably has a primitive carbonaceous composition. It was discovered by German-American astronomer C. H. F. Peters on September 19, 1870, and named after Iphigenia, a princess sacrificed by her father in Greek mythology. The orbital elements for 112 Iphigenia were published by German astronomer Friedrich Tietjen in 1871.

This body is orbiting the Sun with a period of 3.80 years and an eccentricity of 0.13. The orbital plane is inclined by 2.6° to the plane of the ecliptic. 112 Iphigenia has a cross-section diameter of ~72 km. Photometric observations of this asteroid during 2007 at the Observatorio Astronómico de Mallorca were used to create a light curve plot, which was published in 2010. This showed a relatively long synodic rotation period of  hours (1.3 days) and a brightness variation of  magnitude during each cycle. These findings agree with independent results reported in 2008, which gave a period of  hours.

References

External links 
 
 

000112
000112
000112
Discoveries by Christian Peters
Named minor planets
18700919
Iphigenia